Râmnicelu may refer to several places in Romania:

 Râmnicelu, a commune in Brăila County
 Râmnicelu, a commune in Buzău County